Madoniella is a genus of checkered beetles in the family Cleridae. There are about 11 described species in Madoniella.

Species
These 11 species belong to the genus Madoniella:
 Madoniella aktis Opitz, 2010
 Madoniella californica (Van Dyke, 1923)
 Madoniella caporaali Pic, 1935
 Madoniella chiricahua
 Madoniella cracentis Opitz, 2011
 Madoniella crinis
 Madoniella dislocata (Say, 1825)
 Madoniella merkeli (Horn, 1896)
 Madoniella minor Pic, 1935
 Madoniella pici Lepesme, 1947
 Madoniella rectangularis

References

Further reading

 

Cleridae
Articles created by Qbugbot